The 1981–82 NBA season was the Kings 33rd season in the NBA and their tenth season in the city of Kansas City.

Draft picks

Roster

Regular season

Season standings

z - clinched division title
y - clinched division title
x - clinched playoff spot

Record vs. opponents

Game log

Player statistics

Awards and records

Transactions

References

See also
 1981-82 NBA season

Sacramento Kings seasons
K
Kansas City
Kansas City